Dognina honeyi is a moth of the family Notodontidae. It is found in north-eastern Ecuador.

The length of the forewings is 17.5–21 mm. The ground colour of the forewings is light taupe with a suffusion of coppery brown. The ground color of the hindwings is taupe with a suffusion of coppery scales.

Larvae have been reared on Boehmeria and Miriocarpa species.

Etymology
The species is named in honour of Martin Honey, curator of Lepidoptera at the Natural History Museum, London.

References

Moths described in 2011
Notodontidae